The canton of Bernay is an administrative division of the Eure department, northern France. It was created at the French canton reorganisation which came into effect in March 2015. Its seat is in Bernay.

It consists of the following communes:

Bernay
Caorches-Saint-Nicolas
Corneville-la-Fouquetière
Courbépine
Fontaine-l'Abbé
Malouy
Menneval
Mesnil-en-Ouche
Le Noyer-en-Ouche
Plainville
Plasnes
Saint-Léger-de-Rôtes
Saint-Martin-du-Tilleul
Saint-Victor-de-Chrétienville
Serquigny
Treis-Sants-en-Ouche
Valailles

References

Cantons of Eure